The Indonesian Film Festival (Indonesian: Festival Film Indonesia, 'FFI') is an annual awards ceremony organised by the Indonesian Film Board and the Ministry of Education, Culture, Research and Technology to celebrate cinematic achievements in the Indonesian film industry. During the festival, the Piala Citra winners are announced and the best Indonesian films of the year are presented.

The awards ceremony was first held in 1955 as the Pekan Apresiasi Film Nasional (National Film Appreciation Week). It changed to Festival Film Indonesia in 1973. In 1986, the festival included awards for television movies with an award called Piala Vidia.

This awards ceremony includes numerous similarities when compared to the Academy Awards in the United States, BAFTA Film Awards in the United Kingdom and AACTA Awards in Australia.

History
In 1955, 1960 and 1967 Pekan Apresiasi Film Nasional (English: National Film Appreciation Week) was held in Jakarta. From 1973–1992 the ceremony was renamed Festival Film Indonesia and became an annual event. The trophy/award was named Piala Citra (Citra Award). The All-Indonesia Cinema Owners' Association (Gabungan Pengusaha Bioskop Seluruh Indonesia, or GPBSI) awarded the Antemas Prize, named for the producer Antemas. From 1993–2003 the festival did not take place, because the quantity of good Indonesian movies had dropped significantly. In the 1990s, most Indonesian movie producers created low budget, B movies. Producers suffered revenue losses because of growing piracy. Since 1992, American, Hong Kong and Taiwanese movies took over many theaters. Low budget Indonesian movies get the dregs, such as open theatre cinemas, portable cinemas, direct to video, or on TV. In 2004 the Indonesian Film Festival committee launched and returned the event to an annual affair. In 2014 the Indonesian Film Board was formed and FFI changed the award statuette. In 2017 the Indonesian Film Board added two more awards for unique and creative films, raising the total to 21. In 2018 awards were given in 23 categories.

Citra Awards
Citra Awards are accolades by the Committee to recognize excellence of professionals in the Indonesian film industry, including directors, actors and writers.

In 2009, the Indonesian Film Festival Committee replaced the National Body of Motion Picture as the official event organizer of the Indonesian Film Festival. The Committee was authorized by the Ministry of Culture and Tourism of Indonesia to organize the operational process of Citra Awards' ceremony and the selection (voting) of nominations and winners.

In 2014, the Indonesian Film Board replaced the Indonesian Film Festival Committee as the festival organizer. The festival is audited by Deloitte. The Ministry of Tourism of Indonesia oversees the organizer.

The Citra Award, often mistakenly called the FFI Award (Indonesian Film Festival), is the title of the event where the Citra Award and Vidia Award winners are announced.

Current awards
The categories of Citra Awards are:
 Best Picture (in Indonesian: Film Bioskop Terbaik): 1955 to present
 Best Director (Penyutradaraan Terbaik): 1955 to present
 Best Actor (Pemeran Utama Pria Terbaik): 1955 to present
 Best Actress (Pemeran Utama Wanita Terbaik): 1955 to present
 Best Supporting Actor (Pemeran Pendukung Pria Terbaik): 1955 to present
 Best Supporting Actress (Pemeran Pendukung Wanita Terbaik): 1955 to present
 Best Art Direction (Tata Artistik Terbaik): 1955 to present
 Best Cinematography (Tata Sinematografi Terbaik): 1955 to present
 Best Editing (Penyuntingan Terbaik): 1955 to present
 Best Original Score (Tata Musik Terbaik): 1955 to present
 Best Sound (Tata Suara Terbaik): 1955 to present
 Best Short Film (Film Pendek Terbaik): 2004 to present
 Best Documentary Feature Film (Film Dokumenter Panjang Terbaik): 2006 to 2013, 2015 to present
 Best Original Screenplay (Skenario Asli Terbaik): 2009 to present
 Best Adapted Screenplay (Skenario Adaptasi Terbaik): 2009 to present
 Best Documentary Short Film (Film Dokumenter Pendek Terbaik): 2009, 2013, 2015 to present
 Best Animated Film (Film Animasi Terbaik): 2013 to present
 Best Visual Effects (Tata Efek Visual Terbaik): 2013 to present
 Best Costume Design (Tata Busana Terbaik): 2013 to present
 Best Theme Song (Lagu Tema Terbaik): 2016 to present
 Best Makeup & Hairstyling (Tata Rias Terbaik): 2017 to present

Retired awards
 Best Screenplay (Skenario Terbaik): 1955 to 2008
 Best Documentary (Film Dokumenter Terbaik): 2014

Special awards
 Njoo Han Siang Special Award (Penghargaan Khusus Njoo Han Siang): 2006
 Best Film Critic (Kritik Film Terbaik): 2006
 Lifetime Achievement Award (Penghargaan untuk Pencapaian Seumur Hidup): 2006, 2009 to 2011, 2014, 2017 to 2019
 Best Feature Film Director (Penyutradaraan Terbaik): 2007
 Best Animated Film (Film Animasi Terbaik): 2008
 Best Thematic Short Film (Tema Film Pendek Terbaik): 2008
 Best Short Film Director (Sutradara Film Pendek Terbaik): 2009
 Best New Director (Sutradara Baru Terbaik): 2009, 2011
 Best Children's Film (Film Anak-anak Terbaik): 2009
 Special Documentary Film Award (Penghargaan Khusus Film Dokumenter): 2011
 Special Talent Award (Penghargaan Khusus Pemain Berbakat): 2011
 Best Child Performers (Pemeran Anak-Anak Terbaik): 2014

Vidia Awards
Vidia Awards recognize excellence in the Indonesian television movie industry, including directors, actors and writers. Vidia Awards were first presented in 1986 and awarded in one event with Citra Awards.

From 1992 until 1998, the award was presented separately in an event called Festival Sinetron Indonesia (Indonesian Soap-Opera Festival). The awards were discontinued from 1998 to 2003. The awards returned between 2004 and 2006, then discontinued between 2007 and 2010, and made its return in 2011. The awards were last given in 2014.

See also

 Cinema of Indonesia
 Jakarta International Film Festival

References

External links
  

Film festivals in Indonesia
Annual events in Indonesia
Citra Awards
Film festivals established in 1955
1955 establishments in Indonesia